Black Journal is an American public affairs television program on National Educational Television (NET) and later WNET. It covered issues relevant to African-American communities with film crews sent to Atlanta, Detroit, New Orleans, and Los Angeles, and Ethiopia. The program was originally  an hour-long broadcast each month. In 1971, the journalist Tony Brown took over leadership and later the series transitioned to commercial television under the name Tony Brown’s Journal. The series later returned to public television in 1982 under the new name. Other executive producers included documentary filmmakers Madeline Anderson, William Greaves and St. Clair Bourne.

The show aired until 2008. Black Journal offered a close look at the civil rights movement and Black Power movements of the 1960s and was influential in shaping Black opinion at the time. The show won Emmy, Peabody and Russwurm awards for its coverage of timely issues. WNET and the Library of Congress digitized episodes and contributed copies to the American Archive of Public Broadcasting between 2012 and 2018.

Origins 
Black Journal was publicly funded in response to the Kerner Commission (1967) with a goal of presenting Black urban life and Black issues in order to provide Black Americans with a representation in the media. The Kerner Commission cited inflammatory representation of riots and lack of presence in mass media as sources of Black American discontent. President Lyndon B. Johnson, concerned with the impact of the long, hot summer of 1967, hoped that programs like Black Journal would prevent future riots.

Production 
On June 12, 1968, Black Journal debuted on National Educational Television as a monthly one-hour program initially produced by Alvin Perlmutter, a white producer. Following a strike in August 1968 by Black staff members, Perlmutter was replaced by African-American documentary filmmaker William Greaves, who became the series’ producer, director, and occasional host. Under Greaves’ direction, Black Journal won an Emmy Award in 1969 for excellence in public affairs programming. In 1971, the journalist Tony Brown took over leadership and in 1977 the series transitioned to commercial television under the name Tony Brown’s Journal after many PBS affiliate stations chose not to carry it, preferring instead to air less-controversial public affairs programs. The series returned to public television in 1982 under the new name.

Black Journal had many technical accomplishments. A special program to provide technical training to minorities allowed for apprenticeships for Black Journal crews shooting in the New York area and facilitated minorities into the television industry.

Episodes spanning 1968 to 1977 of Black Journal have been contributed to the American Archive of Public Broadcasting by WNET and the Library of Congress, and features segments on the Black Power Movement, the “black is beautiful” movement, the assassinations of Martin Luther King, Jr. and Malcolm X, the African diaspora, the Black Panthers, Pan-Africanism, media's representation of black people and more.

Featured Guests 
Episodes of Black Journal feature interviews with activist and author Angela Davis and basketball player Kareem Abdul-Jabber, as well as episodes and segments about the black community in Compton, the role of the black artist, and the importance of education in newly independent Guyana. Subjects included education, employment, American history, incarceration, fashion, religion, racism, music, and dance.

Charles Hamilton, Columbia University political science professor and co-author of Black Power with Stokely Carmichael, was a frequent guest. He was presented as a genteel intellectual, and clips were shown of him lecturing in his classes. He also provided commentary on electoral politics. Kathleen Cleaver, Communications Secretary for the Black Panther Party at the time, was a frequent guest and often advocated for violence in the role of Black social justice. Historian Richard Moore was featured on the program as one of the few defenders of civil disobedience in the Black freedom struggle, but he was outnumbered by radicals on the panel.

Featured topics 

Huey Newton's imprisonment
 School decentralization
 Two-part evaluation of the assassination of Martin Luther King, Jr. (pt 1 and pt 2)
 The Poor People's Campaign
 CORE Convention (Summer 1968, Columbus, OH)
 The civil war in Biafra
 The liberation struggles in Mozambique and South Africa
 The growth of a Louisiana cooperative
 Police-community relations
 The assassination of Fred Hampton by police
 The assassination of Bobby Hutton by police
 Nationalist-Marxist debates
 The incarceration of Bobby Seale
 The exile of Eldridge Cleaver
 The election of President Richard Nixon
 Housing integration
 School busing
 Labor struggles from Mississippi to New York
Interview with Minister and Nation of Islam leader Louis Farrakhan

References

Further reading
Acham, Christine. Revolution Televised: Prime Time and the Struggle for Black Power. Minneapolis: University of Minnesota Press, 2004. Print. 
"Brown, Tony." Encyclopedia of World Biography. Ed. Andrea Henderson. 2nd edn, Vol. 24. Detroit: Gale, 2005. 68–70. Gale Virtual Reference Library. June 2, 2016.
Heitner, Devorah. Black Power TV. Durham: Duke University Press, 2013. Print. 

1968 American television series debuts
1960s American documentary television series
1970s American documentary television series
2000s American documentary television series
African-American culture
1977 American television series endings